This article shows all participating team squads at the 2005 Men's NORCECA Volleyball Championship, held from September 8 to September 16, 2005 in the MTS Centre in Winnipeg, Manitoba, (Canada).

Head Coach: Julio Frías

Head coach: Hugh McCutcheon

References
 DOM Roster (Archived 2009-05-28)
 USA Volleyball

N
S